Genomics England is a British company set up and owned by the United Kingdom Department of Health and Social Care to run the 100,000 Genomes Project. The project aimed in 2014 to sequence 100,000 genomes from NHS patients with a rare disease and their families, and patients with cancer. An infectious disease strand is being led by Public Health England.

In the summer of 2019, Chris Wigley was appointed CEO of Genomics England, starting in October 2019. Wigley is a former McKinsey executive known for applying machine learning and artificial intelligence technology.

Activity
Genomics England was formally established as a company on 17 April 2013 and was formally launched on 5 July 2013 as part of the celebrations for the 65th Birthday of the UK's National Health Service
In August 2014, the Wellcome Trust announced that it was investing £27 million in a genome-sequencing hub for Genomics England, allowing the company to become part of the Wellcome Trust Genome Campus, home to the Sanger Institute. On the same date, Prime Minister David Cameron unveiled a new partnership between Genomics England and the sequencing firm Illumina. Illumina’s services for whole genome sequencing were secured in a deal worth around £78 million.

The UK Government also committed £250 million to genomics in the 2015 Spending Review, which ensures the continued role of Genomics England to deliver the project, beyond the life of the project and up to 2021.

On March 26, 2015, AstraZeneca announced that it has joined a public-private consortium with Genomics England to accelerate the development of new diagnostics and treatments arising from the 100,000 Genomes Project.

In October 2018, the U.K.'s Secretary of State for Health and Social Care, Matt Hancock, announced that the program had been expanded with a new goal of sequencing five million genomes within five years. He also announced that starting in 2019, the NHS will offer whole genome sequencing (WGS) to all children suspected of having a rare genetic disease or with cancer.

In July 2019, Genomics England announced Data Release 7, which included the 100,000th whole genome available to researchers.

In June 2020, Genomics England announced a partnership with UK-based biotechnology company Lifebit to deploy a genomic research platform aimed at utilizing the genomic data generated through the 100,000 Genomes Project.

Board members
The Board of Genomics England includes a number of notable scientists: 
 Sir John Chisholm (Executive Chair), former chair of the UK Medical Research Council
 Professor Sir Mark Caulfield (Chief Scientist), Queen Mary University of London 
 Professor Sir John Bell, University of Oxford
 Dame Sally Davies (Non-executive Director), Chief Medical Officer (United Kingdom)
 Professor Ewan Birney (Non-executive Director), Director of the European Bioinformatics Institute (EMBL-EBI)
 Professor Sir Malcolm Grant CBE (Non-executive Director), Chair of the NHS England Board
 Professor Michael Parker (Non-executive Director; Chair of the Ethics Advisory Committee), University of Oxford
 Jon Symonds CBE (Non-executive Director), Chair of Innocoll AG, former Chief Financial Officer of Novartis AG
 Professor Dame Kay Davies (Non-executive Director), University of Oxford

Baroness Nicola Blackwood of North Oxford became Chair of Genomics England in May 2020.

History
Genomics England was established in July 2013 as a company fully owned by the UK Department of Health. The company was launched by Jeremy Hunt, Secretary of State for Health on 5 July, in an announcement timed to coincide with the 65th birthday of the NHS.

A 2019 review identified the 100,000 Genomes Project as an exemplar in involving the public in genomic research. In addition to the delivery of the 100,000 Genomes Project, it is hoped that Genomics England will also mark the beginnings of a UK genomics industry and the start of a personalised medicine service for the NHS.

NHS Genomic Medicine Centres
Following the pilot studies for the 100,000 Genomes Project, NHS England ran a tender to appoint NHS Genomic Medicine Centres with responsibility for recruiting suitable patients, gaining their consent to participate in the project and taking samples for whole genome sequencing by Illumina (company). The successful bidders designated as NHS Genomic Medicine Centres are:
    
 East of England NHS GMC – designated for both cancer and rare disease. Led by Cambridge University Hospitals NHS Foundation Trust
 South London NHS GMC – designated for both cancer and rare disease. Led by Guy's and St Thomas' NHS Foundation Trust
 North West Coast NHS GMC – designated for both cancer and rare disease. Led by Liverpool Women's NHS Foundation Trust
 Greater Manchester NHS GMC – designated for both cancer and rare disease. Led by Central Manchester University Hospitals NHS Foundation Trust
 North Thames NHS GMC – designated for both cancer and rare disease. Led by Great Ormond Street Hospital for Children NHS Foundation Trust
 North East and North Cumbria NHS GMC – designated GMC for rare disease only. Led by The Newcastle upon Tyne Hospitals NHS Foundation Trust
 Oxford NHS GMC – designated for both cancer and rare disease. Led by Oxford University Hospitals NHS Trust
 South West Peninsula NHS GMC – designated for both cancer and rare disease. Led by Royal Devon and Exeter NHS Foundation Trust
 Wessex NHS GMC – designated for both cancer and rare disease. Led by University Hospital Southampton NHS Foundation Trust
 Imperial College Health Partners NHS GMC – designated for both cancer and rare disease. Led by Imperial College Healthcare NHS Trust
 West Midlands NHS GMC – designated for both cancer and rare disease.  Led by University Hospitals Birmingham NHS Foundation Trust

In December 2015, two new NHS Genomic Medicine Centres were announced by NHS England:  
 Yorkshire and Humber NHS GMC – designated for both cancer and rare disease. 
 West of England NHS GMC – designated for both cancer and rare disease. 
There are now 13 designated NHS Genomic Medicine Centres (GMCs) across the country.

See also
100,000 Genomes Project

References

External links 
 

2013 establishments in England
British companies established in 2013
Companies based in the London Borough of Islington
Department of Health and Social Care
Genetics in the United Kingdom
Genome projects
Genomics companies
2013 in science
Government-owned companies of England
Population genetics organizations